Memento Mori Theatricks is an American game company that produces role-playing games and game supplements.

History
Jared Sorensen first expanded his ideas for a LARP into his first public rule set, the Memento Mori Theatricks (1996) LARP for Vampire: The Masquerade. On March 26, 1998, he registered memento-mori.com as the home of Pulp Era (1998), a game co-designed with James Carpio and Jon Richardson; the site would take off as a repository of most of Sorensen's games and game ideas about two years later. By 2001, Sorensen had about 20 games and game ideas available on his Memento Mori site, although many of them were unfinished and unplayable.  Schism was produced as the first of five “mini-supplements” that appeared for Sorcerer in July 2001; Sorensen initially sold the 36-page black & white PDF as a book through his Memento Mori website, his first such commercial book.  In late 2001, Sorensen pushed Memento Mori toward being a professional publisher, and concentrated Memento Mori's more official focus on three games that he'd completed by releasing the Ghostbusters-influenced InSpectres (2002), the Mad Max-influenced octaNe (2002), and the b-horror movie Squeam (2002) as commercial PDFs; together with Schism, they built the foundation for Memento Mori's commercial enterprise. Over the next couple of years, Memento Mori sold its first PDFs using the Forge Bookshelf, another innovator in the quickly growing indie field. Memento Mori also published a few PDFs by other authors, including Against the Reich! (2003) by Paul Elliott (an expansion for octaNe), and Le Mon Mouri (2003) by Sean Demory.  The end of Memento Mori's RPG production was in large part due to new jobs that were taking up Sorensen's creative energy, beginning with development work for Dungeons & Dragons Online (2006) and The Lord of the Rings Online (2007).

References

Role-playing game publishing companies